Borregas is a light rail station operated by Santa Clara Valley Transportation Authority (VTA), located in Sunnyvale, California. This station is served by the Orange Line of the VTA Light Rail system. The station is located in an industrial area; nearby offices include the headquarters of Infinera and Ruckus Networks.

Service

Station layout

References

External links

Santa Clara Valley Transportation Authority light rail stations
Transportation in Sunnyvale, California
Railway stations in the United States opened in 1999
1999 establishments in California